Live Wood is the twentieth album by the Athens, Georgia-based band Widespread Panic. It is their ninth official live album release. It was released on the band's Widespread Records imprint on vinyl only for Record Store Day, April 21, 2012.

Track listing
"Blue Indian" (Widespread Panic)	
"Degenerate" (Vic Chesnutt)	
"Tall Boy" (Widespread Panic)	
"The Ballad of John and Yoko" (John Lennon, Paul McCartney)
"Tail Dragger" (Willie Dixon)	
"Fishing"  (Widespread Panic)	
"Many Rivers to Cross" (James E. Chambers)

Personnel
John Bell – Guitar (Acoustic), Guitar (Resonator), Vocals 
Jimmy Herring – Guitar (Acoustic)
Todd Nance – Drums, Vocals 
Domingo S. Ortiz – Percussion
Dave Schools – Bass (Acoustic), Vocals 
John Hermann – Harmonium, Melodica, Piano, Pump Organ, Toy Piano, Vocals
John Keane – Guitar (Acoustic), Guitar (Pedal Steel)

References

External links
Widespread Panic website
Everyday Companion

2012 live albums
Widespread Panic live albums